Gabriel Bortoleto Oliveira (born 14 October 2004) is a Brazilian racing driver, currently competing in the 2023 FIA Formula 3 Championship for Trident. He previously competed for R-ace GP in the 2022 Formula Regional European Championship.

Career

Karting career 
Bortoleto started karting in his native Brazil in 2012 in the Campeonato Sulbrasileiro de Kart. He remained in karts until 2019, with his most successful year being 2018, where he finished third in the European and World Championships in the OKJ-category respectively, and became vice-champion in both the WSK Super Master Series and the Andrea Margutti Trophy.

Lower formula 
Bortoleto made his car racing debut in the 2020 Italian F4 Championship, partnering Sebastian Montoya, Gabriele Minì and Dino Beganovic at Prema Powerteam. His first podium came at Mugello, where he scored second, third, and a victory, taking his first single-seater win in the fourth round of the season. The Brazilian scored two more podiums in Monza and finished the season fifth in the overall championship, ahead of Montoya but behind teammates Beganovic and eventual champion Minì. Bortoleto also finished fourth in the rookies' standings.

Formula Regional European Championship 

In March 2021 it was announced that Bortoleto would be making his debut in the Formula Regional European Championship with FA Racing. He scored his first points in the first race of the season in Imola, where he finished ninth.

FIA Formula 3 Championship 
At the end of September, Bortoleto participated in the 2022 FIA Formula 3 post-season test at Jerez with Trident, partnering Oliver Goethe and Leonardo Fornaroli. Shortly afterwards, he was announced as a Trident driver for the 2023 FIA Formula 3 Championship, becoming the first driver to be announced to a team for that season.

Formula One 
In September 2022, Bortoleto was announced to join two time Formula One champion Fernando Alonso's management team.

Karting record

Karting career summary

Racing record

Racing career summary 

† As Bortoleto was a guest driver, he was ineligible to score points.
* Season still in progress.

Complete Italian F4 Championship results 
(key) (Races in bold indicate pole position) (Races in italics indicate fastest lap)

Complete Formula Regional European Championship results 
(key) (Races in bold indicate pole position) (Races in italics indicate fastest lap)

Complete Formula Regional Asian Championship results
(key) (Races in bold indicate pole position) (Races in italics indicate the fastest lap of top ten finishers)

Complete FIA Formula 3 Championship results 
(key) (Races in bold indicate pole position) (Races in italics indicate fastest lap)

References

External links 
  
 

2004 births
Living people
Brazilian racing drivers
Italian F4 Championship drivers
Formula Regional Asian Championship drivers
Formula Regional European Championship drivers
Prema Powerteam drivers
MP Motorsport drivers
Racing drivers from São Paulo
Stock Car Brasil drivers
FA Racing drivers
R-ace GP drivers
Karting World Championship drivers
FIA Formula 3 Championship drivers
Trident Racing drivers